4949 Akasofu, provisional designation , is a stony Flora asteroid from the inner regions of the asteroid belt, approximately 5 kilometers in diameter. It was discovered by Japanese amateur astronomer Takuo Kojima at the YGCO Chiyoda Station in Japan on 29 November 1988. The asteroid was named for Japanese geophysicist Syun-Ichi Akasofu

Orbit and classification 

Akasofu is a member of the Flora family, one of the largest groups of stony asteroids in the main-belt. It orbits the Sun in the inner main-belt at a distance of 1.9–2.7 AU once every 3 years and 5 months (1,252 days). Its orbit has an eccentricity of 0.17 and an inclination of 5° with respect to the ecliptic.

Physical characteristics

Rotation period 

According to the survey carried out by the NEOWISE mission of NASA's space-based Wide-field Infrared Survey Explorer, Akasofu measures 4.5 kilometers in diameter and its surface has an albedo of 0.32, while the Collaborative Asteroid Lightcurve Link assumes an intermediate albedo of 0.24 – which derives from 8 Flora, the largest member and namesake of this orbital family – and calculates a diameter of 5.7 kilometers with an absolute magnitude of 13.4.

Diameter and albedo 

In October 2005, a rotational lightcurve of Akasofu was obtained from photometric observations made by David Higgins at Hunters Hill Observatory, Australia. It showed a rotation period of  hours with a brightness variation of 0.10 in magnitude.

Observations by Czech astronomer Petr Pravec in March 2007, gave another well-defined and concurring lightcurve with a period of  hours and an amplitude of 0.15 in magnitude.

Naming 

This minor planet was named in honor of Japanese-born geophysicist Syun-Ichi Akasofu (born 1930), professor at University of Alaska Fairbanks. He was the director of the International Arctic Research Center from 1998 to 2007, and is known for studies of the aurora borealis. The official naming citation was published by the Minor Planet Center on 30 March 2010.

Notes

References

External links 
 Asteroid Lightcurve Database (LCDB), query form (info )
 Dictionary of Minor Planet Names, Google books
 Asteroids and comets rotation curves, CdR – Observatoire de Genève, Raoul Behrend
 Discovery Circumstances: Numbered Minor Planets (1)-(5000) – Minor Planet Center
 
 

004949
Discoveries by Takuo Kojima
Named minor planets
19881129